Henry Joseph Gill (1836 – 1903) was an Irish publisher, translator, and politician.

He was educated at Castleknock College, Dublin and was a graduate of Trinity College Dublin, Henry Joseph Gill was the managing editor of M. H. Gill and Sons, publishers.

He translated works including The Cid Campeador by Antonio de Trueba.

He was Irish Parliamentary Party MP for Westmeath from 1880 to 1883 and for Limerick City from 1885 to 1888.

His son Henry Gill S.J., M.C., D.S.O., Jesuit priest, scientist, and served as a chaplain in the great war, where he earned Military Cross, Distinguished Service Order, serving with the 2nd Royal Irish Rifles.

References

External links 

1836 births
1903 deaths
Members of the Parliament of the United Kingdom for County Limerick constituencies (1801–1922)
Members of the Parliament of the United Kingdom for County Westmeath constituencies (1801–1922)
Irish Parliamentary Party MPs
UK MPs 1880–1885
UK MPs 1885–1886
UK MPs 1886–1892